Miss Universe Thailand 2018 was the 19th edition of the Miss Universe Thailand pageant. It was held on 30 June 2018 at the Royal Paragon Hall, Siam Paragon in Bangkok, and was hosted by Sanya Kunakorn and Elizabeth Sadler Leenanuchai. Maria Ehren, Miss Universe Thailand 2017 crowned her successor Sophida Kanchanarin at the end of the event. Kanchanarin represented Thailand at the Miss Universe 2018 pageant on 16 December 2018 in Bangkok and was placed as a Top 10 finalist.

Results

§: Nicolene directly entered the Top 16 after winning Miss People's Choice.

Special awards

Delegates

40 contestants competed for the title of Miss Universe Thailand 2018.

References

External links
 Miss Universe Thailand Official website

2017
2018 in Bangkok
2018 beauty pageants
Beauty pageants in Thailand
June 2018 events in Thailand